Casey Eichfeld (born 15 November 1989) is an American slalom canoeist who has competed at the international level since 2004. He won gold medals in single and double canoe at the 2015 Pan American Games. He competed in the 2008, 2012 and 2016 Olympics with the best result of seven place in the C1 event in 2016. At the world championships his best achievement is fourth place in C1 in 2015.

Early life
Eichfeld was born to Steve and Kathy Eichfeld. He has a sister Erin and a brother Devon. He trained in dancing for seven years to improve balance and flexibility. Eichfeld took up canoeing aged 5; by the age of 8 he competed nationally and was a member of the national cadet team, and by 14 took part in international competitions.

Career
He and teammate Rick Powell were eliminated in the qualifying round of the C2 event at the 2008 Summer Olympics, finishing 11th. Eichfeld placed 14th in the C1 event at the 2012 Olympics. At the 2016 Rio Games, he finished 7th in the C1 event and 10th in the C2 event, with Devin McEwan.

On September 10, 2016, Eichfeld earned his first career medal in a major global race, when he took home bronze in the C1 event at the ICF Canoe Slalom World Cup Final in Tacen, Slovenia.

In the C2 class he paddled with Rick Powell from 2006 to 2008. From 2011 to 2016 he was partnered by Devin McEwan.

World Cup individual podiums

1 Pan American Championship counting for World Cup points

References

External links

 
 

1989 births
American male canoeists
Canoeists at the 2008 Summer Olympics
Canoeists at the 2012 Summer Olympics
Canoeists at the 2016 Summer Olympics
Living people
Olympic canoeists of the United States
Sportspeople from Harrisburg, Pennsylvania
Canoeists at the 2015 Pan American Games
Pan American Games medalists in canoeing
Pan American Games gold medalists for the United States
Medalists at the 2015 Pan American Games